T. Rex Autopsy is a 2015 documentary airing on the National Geographic channel where a team of four paleontologists dissect a silicon replica of Tyrannosaurus. The four palentologists were Tori Herridge, Stephen Brusatte, Matthew T. Mossbrucker and Luke Gamble, who is the lead anatomist. The T. rex was based on the most complete fossil, "Sue".

List of dinosaurs featured 

 Tyrannosaurus rex
 Acheroraptor
 Corythosaurus

References

2015 films
Documentary films about dinosaurs
2015 documentary films
American documentary films
2010s American films